Patrick Thomas "Paddy" Noonan (4 September 1875 – 27 January 1935) was an Australian rules footballer who played for the Fitzroy Football Club and Carlton Football Club in the Victorian Football League.

Football
A small rover, Noonan played in Fitzroy's inaugural VFL season in 1897 and then their inaugural premiership side the following year. In 1901 he crossed to Carlton and spent two seasons with the Blues.

Noonan spent the rest of his career in the Victorian Football Association (VFA) where he captained North Melbourne to premierships in 1903 and 1904. Noonan also spent some time playing at fellow VFA side Williamstown Football Club.

Following North Melbourne's entry to the VFL, Noonan was appointed coach in 1929, where North Melbourne finished last, with their only win coming against Footscray. Noonan remains the oldest first-time coach in VFL/AFL history.

See also
 The Footballers' Alphabet

Notes

References
 'Follower', "The Footballers' Alphabet", The Leader, (Saturday, 23 July 1898), p.17.

External links

 
 

1875 births
Fitzroy Football Club players
Fitzroy Football Club Premiership players
Carlton Football Club players
Williamstown Football Club players
North Melbourne Football Club (VFA) players
North Melbourne Football Club coaches
Australian rules footballers from Melbourne
1935 deaths
One-time VFL/AFL Premiership players
People from North Melbourne